Jean-Luc Montama (born 28 October 1956) is a French karateka who won a gold medal at the 1980 World Karate Championships at men's kumite+80 kg.

References

External links

French male karateka
1956 births
Living people
20th-century French people
21st-century French people